Spelaeoecia is a genus of crustaceans in the family Thaumatocyprididae. One species, the Bermudan endemic S. bermudensis, is listed as critically endangered on the IUCN Red List. It contains the following species:
Spelaeoecia barri Kornicker in Kornicker & Barr, 1997
Spelaeoecia bermudensis Angel & Iliffe, 1987
Spelaeoecia capax Kornicker in Kornicker, Yager & Williams, 1990
Spelaeoecia cubensis Kornicker & Yager, 1996
Spelaeoecia hox Kornicker, Iliffe & Harrison-Nelson, 2007
Spelaeoecia jamaicensis Kornicker & Iliffe, 1992
Spelaeoecia mayan Kornicker & Iliffe, 1998
Spelaeoecia parkeri Kornicker, Iliffe & Harrison-Nelson, 2002
Spelaeoecia sagax Kornicker in Kornicker, Yager & Williams, 1990
Spelaeoecia saturno Kornicker & Yager, 2002
Spelaeoecia styx Kornicker in Kornicker, Yager & Williams, 1990

References

Ostracod genera
Halocyprida
Taxonomy articles created by Polbot